Madi is a municipality in Sankhuwasabha District of Province No. 1 in Nepal. It is a municipality out of 5 municipalities in Sankhuwasabha District. The municipality was established in March 2017 merging some former VDCs: e.g. Madi Mulkharka, Madi Rambeni and Mawadin. The municipality is divided into 13 wards. The headquarter of the municipality is in Okharbote.

The municipality is surrounded by Terhathum District in east, Chainpur Municipality in west and north and Dharmadevi Municipality in south.

References

External links
 www.madimunsankhuwasabha.gov.np

Populated places in Sankhuwasabha District
Municipalities in Koshi Province
Nepal municipalities established in 2014
Municipalities in Sankhuwasabha District